Quest Ventures (formerly QuestVC) is a venture capital firm founded in 2011 by James Tan and Wang Yunming in Beijing, China. The firm mainly focuses on digital commerce investments and has an office in Singapore. The firm deploys funds across Asia in countries such as Singapore, Malaysia, Vietnam, and Indonesia. Quest Ventures is also the largest anchor tenant at JTC Launchpad.

History 
In 2011, James Tan and Wang Yunming, cofounders of Nasdaq listed 55tuan, launched a venture fund to focus on investments in China and Southeast Asia. The firm is active in supporting the operations of its portfolio companies. Quest Ventures is a partner of the Malaysia Digital Economy Corporation (MDEC), co-investor of the Cradle Fund, an approved mentor partner for investments of Enterprise Singapore, and is an iJAM investment partner with the National Research Foundation of Singapore.

In 2017, Quest Ventures was the title sponsor of the Quest Ventures-EDGE National Youth Entrepreneurship Awards.

In 2020, Quest Ventures announced a partnership with ScaleUp Malaysia Accelerator to invest in Malaysian startups.

As of 2022, Quest Ventures has launched 3 thematic funds and invested in more than 100 companies around the world.

Investments 
The firm invests primarily in early-stage digital commerce startups that are based in Southeast Asia. It invests in the “seed” and “series A” stage. The company characterizes digital commerce startups as companies that have “scalability and replicability in large internet communities.”

Quest Ventures has invested in more than 100 companies since its founding, including Carousell, 99.co, Burpple, Watch Over Me, ShopBack and NodeFlair in Southeast Asia. Vulcan Post has described James Tan, Managing Partner of Quest Ventures, as an investor with the Midas touch. The firm is typically the first investor in startups, and primarily looks at the team of founders when making an investment decision.

See also 
 Seed funding
 Series A funding

References 

Financial services companies of China
Venture capital firms